The 1943–44 international cricket season was abandoned due to prevailing Second World War. There were no any domestic cricket played in any country.

See also
 Cricket in World War II

References

International cricket competitions by season
1944 in cricket